The Northern Virginia trolleys were the network of electric passenger rails that moved people around the Northern Virginia suburbs of Washington, DC from 1892 to 1941. They consisted of as many as three separate companies connecting Rosslyn, Great Falls, Bluemont, Mount Vernon, Fairfax City, Camp Humphries and Nauck to Washington, DC on six different lines.

Despite early success, the trolleys struggled. They were unable to set their own prices and found it difficult to compete with automobiles and buses. As roads were paved and improved they gradually lost customers. A final blow came in 1932, when they were forced to give up their direct connection to Washington, DC and much of the system was shut down that year. Financial difficulties of the Great Depression led them to continue to remove parts of the system as the 1930's continued and the last passenger service was terminated in 1941.

Northern Virginia's trolleys were originally operated by three different companies that all planned to operate within the District of Columbia, but were never integrated into the Washington streetcar network. Two companies started in 1892, the Washington, Arlington and Falls Church Railway Company and the Washington, Arlington and Mount Vernon Railway. Their tracks were laid when most of Northern Virginia was undeveloped and had few streets and roads. As a result, the trolleys mostly operated on private right-of-ways that their companies leased or owned. After they began operating, a number of communities developed along their routes. In 1910, following bankruptcy, they merged into one system, the Washington-Virginia Railway. 12 years later that company went into receivership. They emerged from bankruptcy in 1927 as two separate companies again. They were eventually purchases or transformed into bus companies and by the end of 1939 were no longer operating trolleys.  A third company, the Washington and Old Dominion, operated electric cars from 1911 to 1936 as the Washington and Old Dominion Railway and from 1936 to 1941 as the Washington and Old Dominion Railroad. 

At its peak the system consisted of lines that ran from downtown DC to Fort Humphries/Mount Vernon, to Fairfax via Clarendon and to Rosslyn; from Rosslyn to Fairfax and Nauck; From Alexandria to Bluemont via Bon Air; from Georgetown to Bon Air and from Georgetown to Great Falls. 

The major lines of the Washington-Virginia Railway converged at Arlington Junction, which was located in the northwest corner of the present-day Crystal City south of The Pentagon and in Rosslyn at the south end of the Aqueduct Bridge, near the spot where the Key Bridge is now. There it had a terminal adjacent to the Rosslyn station of the W&OD. 

From Arlington Junction, the W-V Railway's trolleys then crossed the Potomac River near the site of the present 14th Street bridges over the 1872 Long Bridge and then, beginning in 1906, the oldHighway Bridge. They then traveled to a terminal in downtown Washington located along Pennsylvania Avenue, NW, and D Street, NW, between 12th and 13 1/2 Streets, NW, on a site that is now near the Federal Triangle Metro station and the Old Post Office building within the Federal Triangle. 

The W&OD Railway terminated in Georgetown at a station on the west side of the Georgetown Car Barn after crossing the Potomac River from Rosslyn over the Aqueduct Bridge. After the Francis Scott Key Bridge replaced the Aqueduct Bridge in 1923, the W&OD was no longer allowed to cross into DC. Instead, Washington streetcars crossed the river on the new bridge and entered a turnaround loop within Rosslyn. There, passengers could transfer between trolleys whose lines separately served Washington and Northern Virginia.

Most of what remains of the system is affiliated with the W&OD, which has been turned into two trails, a park, part of I-66 and Old Dominion Drive. There is little that remains of the W-V system, butwhat there is consists of three stations; a rail yard that is now bus garages; an old abutment where the Fairfax trolley used to cross over the W&OD; part of a bridge over Accontink Creek in Fairfax; and, in a few places such as the gap in Center Street in Fairfax, embankments or cuts. The most prevalent remnant of the W-V system are the roads built on the right of way, most notably Electric Ave, Potomac Avenue, Wittington Blvd and parts of the George Washington Memorial Parkway and E. Boulevard in Fairfax County; Kenmore St., Eads St and parts of both Walter Reed Dr and I-66 in Arlington County; and Commonwealth Ave in Alexandria

Washington-Virginia Railway 

The Washington-Virginia Railway (W-V Railway) was chartered in 1910 to operate an electric line from Bluemont to Vienna. That same year it took control of the Washington, Alexandria, and Mount Vernon Electric Railway and the Washington, Arlington and Falls Church Railways. In 1912 it merged with the Washington Utilities Company, but in 1913 that merger was barred by federal law. Following that failed merger, the railways were transferred back to the W-V Railway and the Washington Utilities Company was shut down.

Washington, Alexandria, and Mount Vernon Electric Railway

Washington-Mount Vernon line 
The Washington, Alexandria, and Mount Vernon Electric Railway began operating between Alexandria and Mount Vernon in 1892. In 1896 it completed its tracks to Arlington Junction, located near the present day corner of S. Eads and S. 12th Streets in Arlington. From Arlington Junction it used the Belt Line Street Railway Company's tracks on 14th Street NW to reach the 1872 Long Bridge. At the time it opened in July 1896, it was the longest electric streetcar line in the world.

In 1902, the railroad moved its station, as the Belt Line's tracks were circling the block containing the site of a planned new District Building (now the John A. Wilson Building). The new station (address: 1204 N. Pennsylvania Avenue) extended along Pennsylvania Avenue, NW, and D Street, NW, from 12th Street, NW, to 13 1/2 Street, NW, near the site of the present Federal Triangle Metro station and on the opposite side of 12th Street from the Old Post Office building.

In 1906, the 1872 Long Bridge's streetcar tracks and road were relocated to the Highway Bridge, a new truss bridge immediately west of the older bridge. This span was removed in 1967.

After crossing the Potomac River, the trolleys entered Arlington County (named Alexandria County before 1920) to run southward near and along the present route of Interstate 395 (I-395). They then reached Arlington Junction. At the Junction, the line's route diverged from that of a line that traveled west to Fairfax City and which connected to others that served Arlington National Cemetery, Rosslyn and Nauck. After leaving Arlington Junction, trolleys on the Washington-Mount Vernon line continued south along the present route of S. Eads Street while travelling largely on the grade of a towpath on the west side of the defunct Alexandria Canal. Near Arlington's present southern border at Four Mile Run, the railroad and its affiliates constructed an amusement park (Luna Park) and a rail yard containing a car barn and a power plant.

After crossing Four Mile Run into present-day Alexandria, the trolleys continued to travel south along the present route of Commonwealth Avenue. The Mount Vernon line then passed under a bridge at St. Elmo that carried the Bluemont branch of the Southern Railway and later the branch's successor, the Bluemont Division of the W&OD Railway. The lines' St. Elmo stations, located in Alexandria's present Del Ray neighborhood, gave travelers an opportunity to transfer between the railroads.

The Mount Vernon line's trolleys then continued southward along Commonwealth Avenue until reaching King Street near Alexandria's Union Station. The line's trolleys then turned to travel east on King Street until they reached a station at Royal Street, in the center of Old Town Alexandria next to Market Square. They then turned again, traveled south on S. Royal Street and crossed Hunting Creek to enter Fairfax County on a -long bridge containing a concrete and steel center span and trestle.

After crossing Little Hunting Creek, they reached a turnaround loop on which they traveled to a terminal constructed near the entrance to the grounds of George Washington's home in Mount Vernon.

At Mount Vernon, when the electric railway began service, the estate's proprietors insisted that only a modest terminal be constructed next to the trolley turnaround. They were afraid that the dignity of the site would be marred by unrestricted commercial development and persuaded financier Jay Gould to purchase and donate thirty-three acres outside the main gate for protection.

By 1906, the railway had transported 1,743,734 passengers along its routes with 92 daily runs. The route became known as the "Road of the Presidents." Passengers and others could read a 122-page Hand-book for the Tourist Over the Washington, Alexandria and Mount Vernon Electric Railway that described in detail the railway's routes and stations as well as the landmarks, history and geography of the area through which the railway traveled.

In 1910, the Washington, Alexandria, and Mount Vernon Electric Railway merged with the Washington, Arlington & Falls Church Railway under the control of the previously created Washington-Virginia Railway. 

The rise of the automobile, bad decisions and economic hard times would lead to the demise of the railway. 

The US entered World War I in 1917 and then the Army created Camp Humphreys in early 1918 to train all engineers. At the time the only way to reach it was by boat so in July the railway agreed to build a 5 mile extension to the camp. Money was forwarded to them by the War Department and the U.S. Railroad Administration and they purchased 49 new cars with it. While they originally planned to finish the work in 60 days, they were only able to build about 4 miles, and only electrify a few hundred feet, before they ran out of financing. Meanwhile a standard gauge railroad connection from the Richmond, Fredericksburg & Potomac Railroad opened in July and the Richmond-Washington Highway was paved in October, reducing the need for the electric rail. When the war ended on Nov 11, 1918 the incentive to invest in the line largely disappeared and, as a result, the line sat disused for years. At the end of 1920, the US Government cut a deal to finish the line and operate service on it, paying rent to the streetcar with an option to buy it. By that time the company was already reorganizing. During the spring of 1921, troops at the engineering school finished the line. The corps of engineers bought a single yellow, Brill-Mack rail gasoline rail car and trailer and ran the line for about a year, before stopping service because it was too costly. The project left the railway with a million dollars of debt. The debt, competition from automobiles resulting from the paving of the highway and the construction of new roads, led the company into receivership in 1923. It continued to operate in receivership until 1927.

In 1925, Robert L. May received a charter to operate a bus line between Washington and Alexandria, something the railways had wanted to do. At the time, many correctly predicted that it would lead to the end of the Washington-Virginia railway.

In 1927, the two railways were separated and sold at auction, the Washington-Mount Vernon line (AKA the Mount Vernon Division) becoming the Mount Vernon, Alexandria and Washington Railway.

The next year, Congress passed legislation to build the George Washington Memorial Parkway and they later began negotiations to purchase the line between Alexandria and Mount Vernon as the parkway would follow the route of the railway in several places and the land at the terminus was needed for the park planned along the road. In early 1930, it was announced that the line south of Alexandria, which had long been losing money, would be abandoned, scrapped and the land sold to the federal government. On February 4 they petitioned the state for authority to abandon the 8 miles of line, following which the federal government paid $150,000 for it. A few days after announcing the abandonment, the owners announced a deal to sell the tracks, trolley wires, incidentals and rolling stock, including a once state-of-they art luxury car used to carry Presidents and other dignitaries to Mount Vernon, for scrap metal. Scrapping of the line began on 1 March 1930.

In May 1930, the railway was sold to Robert L. May and merged with the bus service, with both reducing service and raising prices.

In 1926, the federal government began planning for Federal Triangle. By 1931 it was decided that the DC terminal and a portion of tracks for the Mount Vernon, Alexandria and Washington railway would need to be removed to make way for the project.  The company sued to prevent this, but lost their case and an appeal to the Public Utilities Commission to use a different route. In early 1932, after being threatened with having their charter stripped and being promised compensation, they agreed to end service to Washington. The last trolley between Arlington Junction and downtown Washington ran on January 18, 1932, two days after the George Washington Memorial Parkway opened. Its operations were replaced with buses from Arlington Junction to a new bus terminal in DC and the tracks between the Bridge and Arlington Junction removed to widen route 31. For a brief time it operated as the Mount Vernon, Alexandria and Arlington railway, but it was granted permission to suspend service which it did on April 9th of that year. The tracks and other equipment in Alexandria and Arlington were removed except on the paved streets of Alexandria, and in the fall Alexandria negotiated for the removal of the tracks in the city. However, in 1934, finding the cost out of reach, Robert L. May negotiated the transfer of the right of way to the city in exchange for not having to remove them. 

Not much of the line remains. Some streets follow the right-of-way and the path of the trolley turnaround at Mount Vernon remains as a traffic circle at the south end of the Parkway, while the former rail yard in southern Arlington now serves as a Metrobus yard.

Stations 
The stations on the Washington-Mount Vernon Line of the Washington, Alexandria, and Mount Vernon Electric Railway (Alexandria-Mount Vernon Branch of the Washington-Virginia Railway) were (with locations of sites in 2008):

Remnants of the Washington-Mount Vernon line 

 Roads
 Wittington Boulevard, Fairfax County. Coordinates: 
 East Boulevard Drive, Fairfax County. Coordinates: 
 Potomac Avenue, Fairfax County. Coordinates:  
 Commonwealth Avenue, Alexandria. Coordinates: 
 South Eads Street, Arlington. Coordinates: 
 Metrobus yard
 Former rail yard at S. Eads Street (east side) and S. Glebe Road (north side), Arlington. Coordinates: 
 Traffic circle
 Former trolley turnaround at Mount Vernon estate, Fairfax County. Coordinates: 
 Tracks – In May 2020, during repair of a water main on King Street, a work crew of the Alexandria Department of Transportation and Environmental Services discovered old tracks buried under the pavement.

Rosslyn branch 
The Washington, Alexandria, and Mount Vernon Electric Railway constructed the Rosslyn branch, which traveled from Arlington Junction to the Virginia end of the Aqueduct Bridge in Rosslyn. It began passenger service on 22 May 1896, just weeks before the Mount Vernon line was connected to it. 

After leaving Arlington Junction, the Rosslyn branch traveled northwest along a route that was south of the future site of The Pentagon, crossed Columbia Pike and entered Mt. Vernon Junction. At that junction, the Rosslyn branch met the South Arlington branch, which the Washington, Arlington & Falls Church Railroad constructed.

After leaving Mt. Vernon Junction, the Rosslyn branch crossed the southern boundary of the federally-owned "Arlington Reservation". The site of the crossing was at that time near the southeast corner of Arlington National Cemetery, which was within the Reservation. After entering the Reservation, the branch turned to travel north along the eastern side of Arlington Ridge Road (formerly named the Alexandria & Georgetown Turnpike), which was outside of the Cemetery near the Cemetery's eastern wall.

While traveling next to Arlington Ridge Road, the branch passed the Cemetery's McClellan and Sheridan Gates. An expansion of the Cemetery later encompassed this portion of the Road, whose route no longer exists within the Cemetery.

Construction of the branch permitted visitors from Washington, D.C., to reach the Cemetery by rail for the first time. However, after leaving the trolleys outside of the Sheridan Gate at the branch's Arlington station, visitors needed to ascend a steep hill to reach most of the Cemetery's well-known features and burial sites.

After passing its Arlington station, the branch crossed the north boundary of the Reservation and turned to travel northwest until it met Rosslyn's Chadwick Avenue (now named N. Lynn Street), on which it traveled north. The branch ended near the Aqueduct Bridge at the railway's Rosslyn terminal.

The line was built primarily as a way to compete for Arlington Cemetery patronage. Following the merger that created the Washington-Virginia system, service to the cemetery was primarily provided by the Falls Church line, so in May of 1921 they sought and received permission to discontinue service of the line. The only opposition came from workers at the Government Experimental Farm located on the east side of the track. 

The tracks were removed in the 1930's and right of way was taken for use in the Pentagon, it's nearby traffic interchanges and an expansion of Arlington National Cemetery.

Rosslyn branch stations 
 
The stations of the Rosslyn branch were (with locations of sites in 2008):

Washington, Arlington & Falls Church Railway 
During its forty years of life, this interurban trolley company operated under a variety of names, as it repeatedly expanded, reorganized or contracted.

Washington & Arlington — 1892–1896

On February 28, 1891, the United States Congress enacted a statute that incorporated the Washington, Arlington and Falls Church Railway Company in the District of Columbia, with authorization to reach Fort Myer and the northwest entrance of Arlington National Cemetery (the Cemetery's Fort Myer Gate) by crossing the Potomac River on a new bridge that the company would construct at or near the "Three Sisters" islets. The system started in 1892 as a horsecar line with tracks from Rosslyn up the hill to the Cemetery's Fort Myer Gate – this would later become the Nauck Line. In late 1895, the system was electrified. The company never constructed its planned Three Sisters Bridge. "Arlington" in the name referred to the cemetery and the house as Arlington County did not exist yet. 

Washington, Arlington & Falls Church — 1896–1910

In 1896, track was laid from Rosslyn through Clarendon and Ballston to Falls Church, constituting the North Arlington Branch and part of the Fairfax Line, and the name was changed to the Washington, Arlington & Falls Church (WA&FC). The track though Fort Myer was extended past the northwest entrance to Arlington National Cemetery to reach Penrose in 1900 and Nauck, just north of Four Mile Run, in 1901. That same year saw the opening of about a mile of additional track, extending from East Falls Church to West Falls Church. Work on a far more ambitious extension began at West Falls Church in 1903, bringing the line through Dunn Loring and Vienna in 1904 to reach the Fairfax County Courthouse in Fairfax City. In 1907, the W.A. & F.C. built the South Arlington branch from Clarendon to Mount Vernon Junction, where it met the Washington, Alexandria and Mt. Vernon Railway's Rosslyn branch.

In 1907, the railway was involved in a crash with an automobile that killed the motorman and injured several employees and passengers. The subsequent law suits forced the railway into receivership.

Washington – Virginia — 1910–1927

In late 1910, the WA&FC and Washington, Alexandria & Mt. Vernon were merged to form the Washington – Virginia (W-V) Railway, whereupon the WA&FC became the W-V's Falls Church Division. They opened with the intention of extending the Nauck line to Manassass but were forced to drop that by the DC public Utilities commission. The company fell upon hard times and in 1924 declared bankruptcy. In 1927, the two companies were split and sold at auction.

Arlington & Fairfax Railway — 1927–1937

In 1927, the Arlington & Fairfax was organized by local governments and citizens to take control of the WA&FC line after the W-V went bankrupt. In 1932, the W,A and MV line lost the right to travel into D.C. which cut the A&F off as well. On January 17, 1932, the last Arlington & Fairfax streetcar departed from 12th & D Streets, NW, abandoning all direct service to Washington, D.C. In April the company started running buses from Clarendon straight into Washington and they proved so popular that on August 1st the company abandoned rail service between Clarendon and Arlington Junction. In late 1932, they announced plans to remove the tracks between Clarendon and Arlington Junction. In 1936, the company began to transition from electric cars to auto-railers, small buses that can run on rails on flanged wheels or on roads with rubber tires. These first replaced cars on the Nauck line in the summer of 1936 and then on the Fairfax line between Vienna and Fairfax in December. 

A building at Arlington Junction – about 500 feet southwest of the current intersection of Army-Navy Drive and Eads – that served as a dispatcher's office, substation and passenger waiting room was removed in 1975.

Arlington & Fairfax Auto Railroad — 1937–1939

In 1936, the company was sold to Detroit's Evans Products Company, an innovative railway and automotive industry supplier that had developed the first version of the present hy-rail system called auto-railers, small buses that can run on rails on flanged wheels or on roads with rubber (see Road–rail vehicle).  In 1937, Evans replaced the trolleys with auto-railers. On rail, they went to Rosslyn where they were intended to switch to tires and cross the Key Bridge into Georgetown, eliminating the change in Rosslyn, but Capital Transit prevented that service by objecting that its franchise gave it exclusive service across the bridge. The auto-railers last ran in September 1939.

Nauck line (Fort Myer line) 
Originally constructed by the Washington, Arlington and Falls Church Railroad, the Nauck line (aka the Fort Myer or Green Valley line) of the Washington—Virginia Railway ran south from Rosslyn through Fort Myer to an initially lightly developed area in South Arlington near Four Mile Run. After leaving the railroad's Rosslyn terminal near the Aqueduct Bridge, the line travelled south through Fort Myer Junction along the present routes of N. Lynn Street and N. Meade Street.

The line then turned to the southwest and crossed the northern boundary of the Arlington Reservation and Fort Myer near today's Wright Gate. Within the Fort, trolleys on the line climbed a hill along the present route of McNair Road near the western wall of Arlington National Cemetery to reach a station (Arlington Fort Myer) located within the Fort at the present intersection of McNair Road and Lee Avenue, near the Cemetery's Fort Myer Gate (Chapel Gate of Fort Myer).

After disembarking at the Arlington Fort Myer station, visitors could enter the Cemetery near its highest elevation. This permitted visitors to avoid the ascent required when entering the Cemetery through the Sheridan Gate after traveling on the Rosslyn branch to that branch's Arlington station. After the Rosslyn branch closed in 1921, the Nauck line provided the only rail service that visitors could use to reach the Cemetery.

After leaving the Arlington Fort Myer station, the line traveled south through Fort Myer before turning southwest to cross the South Arlington branch of the railroad's Fairfax line at Hatfield Junction. Passengers could transfer between the two lines at the railroad's adjacent Hatfield station.

Soon after leaving Hatfield Junction and continuing to travel southwest, the Nauck line crossed the west boundary of the Reservation and the Fort, a short distance north of the Fort's Hatfield Gate. The line then crossed the present path of Washington Boulevard (Virginia State Route 27), south of the Boulevard's crossing of Arlington Boulevard (U.S. Route 50)

The Nauck line then traveled southwest and south while partially following the present routes of S. Uhle Street and Walter Reed Drive. After crossing S. Glebe Road (now Virginia State Route 120), the line traveled downhill near the west side of S. Kenmore Street to end at a railway turntable near the intersection of 24th Road S. and S. Kenmore Street. The line terminated a short distance north of the Cowden (Nauck) station of the Southern Railway, and later, of the W&OD Railway's Bluemont Division.

Nauck line stations 

The stations of the Nauck line (Fort Myer-Arlington Branch of the Washington-Virginia Railway) were (with locations of sites in 2008):

Remnants of the Nauck line 
 
 Station
2312 2nd Street S., Arlington, the former Penrose Station now a private residence. Coordinates: 
 Roads
 S. Uhle Street between S. Courthouse Road and 2nd Street S., Arlington. Coordinates:  
 S. Walter Reed Drive between Columbia Pike and 13th Street S., Arlington. Coordinates:

Fairfax line 
The Washington, Arlington and Falls Church Railroad constructed the Fairfax line of the Washington—Virginia Railway. When completed, the line traveled from a terminus in front of the Fairfax County Courthouse in Fairfax City through Oakton, Vienna, Dunn Loring, Falls Church and Ballston to downtown Washington, D.C., and Rosslyn by way of Clarendon.

Trolleys of the Fairfax line began their trips at the old Courthouse, located at the southwest corner of Chain Bridge Road (now part of State Route 123) and Main Street (now part of State Route 236). The cars first ran westward along Main Street and then turned north at the site of the Fairfax Electric Depot (the terminus of the line until the depot burned in 1907) onto the present route of Railroad Avenue.

After crossing the present route of Fairfax Boulevard (U.S. Routes 29 and 50), the line crossed a branch of Accotink Creek and Chain Bridge Road (now Virginia State Route 123). The line then traveled northeast through Fairfax County a short distance east of Chain Bridge Road, crossed another branch of Accotink Creek, passed through Oakton, and reached the town of Vienna.

The line continued northeast in Vienna about a block southeast of Maple Avenue W. (Virginia State Route 123's present name in Vienna). After crossing Center Avenue S, the line's trolleys turned to the northwest on one of three legs of a triangular wye and crossed Maple Avenue E. After leaving the wye, the trolleys stopped at the line's Vienna station.

The Fairfax line's Vienna station was located in the center of town on the southeast side of Church Street NE, a short distance southeast of the tracks of the Southern Railway's Bluemont Branch, which became the W&OD Railway's Bluemont Division in 1912. The Southern's Vienna station (which remains intact on the southwest side of the W&OD Trail) was a block northwest of the Fairfax line's station.

As the Fairfax line's tracks ended near Church Street, trolleys left their station by reversing direction. They then recrossed Maple Avenue E and traveled southeast on a second leg of the wye that paralleled the Southern's tracks, with which there was an interchange. Freight and work cars usually bypassed the station and avoided reversing by turning from the northeast direction to the southeast on the third leg of the wye.

After leaving the wye, the line continued east in Vienna on Ninovan Road, paralleling the Southern's route. The line then crossed the Southern's tracks on a bridge built near Franklin in 1904. After the crossing, the line traveled east in Fairfax County along the present routes of Electric Avenue and Railroad Street (now parts of Virginia State Route 697) and within a railroad cut that is now in South Railway Street Park. The line then crossed the present route of the Capital Beltway (Interstate 495), travelled along the present route of Helena Drive, crossed the present route of Interstate 66 and continued to travel within Fairfax County until it reached the City of Falls Church.

The line continued eastward through Falls Church until it crossed W. Broad Street (now Virginia State Route 7). The line then travelled near the north side of the Southern Railway's tracks, following the present route of Lincoln Avenue until it reached Arlington County (named Alexandria County before 1920). After crossing Four Mile Run and Lee Highway (now part of U.S. Route 29), the line continued to travel eastward north of the Run and the Southern Railway while traveling near and along the present route of Fairfax Drive, which Interstate 66 (I-66) and the Washington Metro's Orange and Silver lines have partially replaced.

The Fairfax line then left the Southern's route, which continued southwest to Alexandria. Further along, the line left that of the present route of I-66, which travels northeast to Rosslyn.

The Fairfax line then traveled along the present paths of Fairfax Drive and the underground tracks of the Washington Metro. Between 1912 and its closing, the line traveled under a plate girder bridge at Waycroft that the W&OD Railway had constructed near the west end of Ballston for its Thrifton-Bluemont Junction connecting line, which I-66 later replaced north and northeast of Ballston.

After entering Ballston, the line passed a complex containing a car barn, rail yard, workshops, electrical substation and general office that the Washington, Arlington and Falls Church Railway had built in 1910 at Lacey near the present intersection of North Glebe Road (now Virginia State Route 120) and Fairfax Drive. Continuing eastward through Ballston on the present route of Fairfax Drive (now Virginia State Route 237), the line reached Clarendon, where it branched.

The North Arlington branch continued to follow the route of Fairfax Drive (now partially replaced by Clarendon Boulevard) through and past Clarendon. The branch then traveled downhill on the present route of Fairfax Drive along the north side of Rocky Run, which U.S. Route 50 now covers.

Approaching Rosslyn, the North Arlington branch turned to the north at Fort Myer Junction and joined the Nauck line. The combined lines then continued north along the present route of N. Lynn Street, joined the Rosslyn branch, and ended near the Aqueduct Bridge at the railroad's Rosslyn terminal.

Beginning in 1906, travelers on the North Arlington and Rosslyn branches and the Nauck line could transfer at the Rosslyn terminal to the Great Falls and Old Dominion Railroad (later the Great Falls Division of the W&OD Railway), which crossed the Potomac River into Georgetown on the Aqueduct Bridge. After the Rosslyn branch closed in 1921 and the Aqueduct Bridge closed in 1923, travelers on the North Arlington Branch and the Nauck line could transfer in Rosslyn to the electric streetcars of the Capital Traction and (later) Capital Transit Companies, which crossed the Potomac on the Francis Scott Key Bridge.

After leaving Clarendon, trolleys on the South Arlington branch largely followed the future routes of Washington Boulevard and Southgate Drive. The branch crossed the Nauck line at Hatfield Junction and joined the Rosslyn branch at Mount Vernon Junction (which received its name because the Rosslyn branch was a part of the Washington, Alexandria, and Mount Vernon Railway when the South Arlington branch first reached it). After leaving Mount Vernon Junction, the branch's trolleys traveled on the Rosslyn branch's tracks until they reached Arlington Junction, where they joined the Washington-Mount Vernon line.

After entering the tracks of the Washington-Mount Vernon line, the South Arlington branch's trolleys (some of which had originated in Fairfax City) crossed the Potomac River on the 1872 Long Bridge and, later, on the Highway Bridge. Their trips ended at the downtown Washington station.

I-66 and the Custis Trail now travel from Lee Highway (U.S. Route 29) in East Falls Church to Ballston on or near the Fairfax line's right of way along the former route of Fairfax Drive. Washington Metro's Orange and Silver Lines now follow the route of the Fairfax line and its North Arlington branch from Lee Highway in East Falls Church to N. Lynn Street in Rosslyn.

Fairfax line stations 
 
The stations of the Fairfax line were (with locations of sites in 2008):

Remnants of the Fairfax line 
 
 Station
 Oakton Station, 2923 Gray Street (between Pine Street and Oakton Drive), Fairfax County. Now a private residence. Includes rail and a raised trolley roadbed.
 Roads
 Railroad Avenue, Fairfax City. Coordinates: 
 Ninovan Road SE, Vienna. Coordinates: 
  Electric Avenue, Vienna and Fairfax County. Coordinates: 
 Railroad Street, Fairfax County. Coordinates: 
 Helena Drive, Fairfax County. Coordinates: 
 Lincoln Avenue, Falls Church. Coordinates: 
 I-66 between N. Sycamore Street and N. Kennebec Street, Arlington. Coordinates: 
 I-66 between N. Harrison Street and N. Edison Street, Arlington. Coordinates: 
 Fairfax Drive, Arlington. Coordinates: 
Bridge remnants 
 Poured concrete railroad bridge abutment on north side of Washington & Old Dominion Railroad Trail between Electric Avenue and Ninovan Road, Vienna. Built in July 1904, according to engravings on its east side. Coordinates: 
 Stone railroad bridge abutment on south side of Washington and Old Dominion Railroad Trail between Electric Avenue and Ninovan Road, Vienna. Coordinates: 
 Abutments and wing walls of demolished railroad bridge over branch of Accotink Creek between Fairfax Village Drive and Cardinal Road, Fairfax City. Coordinates: 
Poured concrete railroad bridge over branch of Accotink Creek near the intersection of Chain Bridge Road and Fairfax Boulevard, behind the 29 Diner in Fairfax City. Coordinates: 
 Trails
 Unpaved trails and trolley cut between Gallows Road and Morgan Lane in South Railroad Street Park, Dunn Loring, Fairfax County. Coordinates:

North Arlington branch 
Constructed by the Washington, Arlington and Falls Church Railroad as part of the Fairfax line, the North Arlington branch of the Washington—Virginia Railway connected Clarendon and Rosslyn. The branch traveled northeast from Clarendon along the present routes of Clarendon Boulevard, Fairfax Drive and N. Lynn Streets, approximating the present underground routes of Washington Metro's Orange and Silver lines. The branch turned to the north when joining the Nauck line at Fort Myer Junction, joined the Rosslyn Branch while traveling north along the present route of N. Lynn Street and ended near the Aqueduct Bridge at the railroad's Rosslyn terminal.

The tracks around Rosslyn Circle were removed in late 1959.

North Arlington branch stations 
 
The stations of the North Arlington branch (Clarendon-Fairfax branch of Washington-Virginia Railway) were (with locations of sites in 2008):

Remnants of North Arlington branch 
 
 Roads
 Clarendon Boulevard, Arlington. Coordinates: 
 Fairfax Drive, Arlington. Coordinates:

South Arlington branch 
Constructed by the Washington, Arlington and Falls Church Railroad, the South Arlington branch of the Washington—Virginia Railway connected the railway's North Arlington and Rosslyn branches when traveling between Clarendon and Mt. Vernon Junction. After most of the Rosslyn branch closed in 1921, the South Arlington branch continued along the remaining route of that branch until it reached Arlington Junction, where it connected with the railway's Washington-Mount Vernon line.

Eastbound trolleys using the branch while traveling to downtown Washington began their trips on the Fairfax line and entered the branch at Clarendon. The branch traveled from Clarendon southeast along the present route of Washington Boulevard and crossed the western boundary of the Arlington Reservation and Fort Myer.

After entering the Fort, the South Arlington branch crossed the Fort Myer-Nauck line at Hatfield Junction. The branch then traveled south until leaving the Fort and other federal property within the Reservation when crossing the Reservation's southern boundary near the Fort's present South Gate.

The branch then traveled east along the present route of Southgate Road, now immediately south of Henderson Hall, Fort Myer and Arlington National Cemetery. After passing the Cemetery's southeast corner, the branch reached Mt. Vernon Junction, where it joined the Rosslyn branch, which was originally a branch of the Washington, Alexandria and Mt. Vernon Electric Railroad.

South Arlington branch stations 
 
The stations of the South Arlington branch of the Washington—Virginia Railway with locations of sites in 2008) were:

Remnant of South Arlington branch 
 Roads
 Washington Boulevard, Arlington. Coordinates:

Historic designations

On October 19, 1994, the Virginia Department of Historic Resources (VDHR) added the Oakton trolley station to the Virginia Landmarks Register (VDHR identification number 029-0477). The National Park Service subsequently added the trolley station to the National Register of Historic Places (NRHP) on February 8, 1995 (NHRP identification number: 95000026).

VDHR staff have determined that several other properties associated with the Washington and Virginia Railway Company/Washington, Arlington and Falls Church Electric Railway (VDHR identification number 029-5470) are not eligible for listing on the NHRP. As of February 6, 2018, the staff had not found any other such properties to be eligible for this listing.

Washington and Old Dominion Railway

Maps
 Expandable 1892 map of Washington, D.C., and suburbs, showing the route of the Washington and Arlington Railway (not labeled) between Rosslyn and Arlington National Cemetery's Fort Myer Gate: 
 1894 topographic map of the city of Alexandria, Alexandria County, Falls Church and eastern Fairfax County, showing the route of the Washington, Alexandria and Mount Vernon Railway (not labeled) between the city of Alexandria and Mount Vernon: 
1894 topographic map of the city of Alexandria, Alexandria County, Falls Church and northeastern Fairfax County, showing the route of the Washington, Alexandria and Mount Vernon Railway in the city of Alexandria and Fairfax County: 
1898 topographic map of Washington, D.C., the city of Alexandria, Alexandria County (now Arlington County), Falls Church and northeastern Fairfax County, showing the routes of the Washington, Arlington & Falls Church Electric Railroad (W.A. & F.C. E.R.R.) and the Washington, Alexandria & Mt. Vernon Electric Railway (W. A. & MT. V. Electric R.R.): 
1900 map of Alexandria County (now Arlington County) and the City of Alexandria, showing the routes of the Washington, Arlington & Falls Church Railway and the Washington, Alexandria & Mt. Vernon Electric Railway: 
1900 map of Alexandria County (now Arlington County), showing the routes of the Washington, Arlington & Falls Church Electric Railway and the Washington, Alexandria & Mt. Vernon Electric Railway: 
November 1901 topographic map of the District of Columbia and northeastern Alexandria County (now Arlington County), showing the routes of the Washington, Arlington & Falls Church Railroad (not labeled) and the Washington, Alexandria & Mt. Vernon Electric Railroad (Wash. Alex. & Mt. Vernon Electric R.R.): 
1904 map of Alexandria County (now Arlington County), the city of Alexandria and northeastern Fairfax County showing the routes of the Washington, Arlington & Falls Church Railroad (W. A & F.C. R.R.) and the Washington, Alexandria & Mt. Vernon Railroad (Wash. Alex. & Mt.V. R.R.): 
1907 map of Alexandria County (now Arlington County) showing the routes of the Washington, Arlington & Falls Church Railway (W.A.&FC RY) and the Washington & Mt. Vernon Railway (WA. & MT. V RY): 

1907 map of Alexandria County, Virginia (now Arlington County), showing the routes of the Washington, Alexandria and Mt. Vernon Railway (W. A. & Mt V. RY.), the Washington, Arlington & Falls Church Railway (W. A. & F. C. RY.) and the Great Falls and Old Dominion Railway (G. F. & O. D. RY.): 
1915 topographic map of northwestern Fairfax County, showing the route of the Fairfax line of the Washington—Virginia Railway (Electric RR) between Vienna and the city of Fairfax and the routes of the Washington and Old Dominion Railway between Vienna and Herndon and between Difficult Run and Great Falls: 
1915 topographic map of Washington, D.C., the city of Alexandria, Alexandria County, Falls Church and northeastern Fairfax County, showing the routes of the Washington—Virginia Railway and the Washington and Old Dominion Railway: 

1917 topographic map of Washington, D.C., the city of Alexandria, Alexandria County, Falls Church and northeastern Fairfax County, showing the routes of the Washington—Virginia Railway and the Washington and Old Dominion Railway: 
1924 topographic map of the city of Alexandria and southeastern Fairfax County showing the Washington-Virginia Railway's route between Alexandria and Mount Vernon: 
1925 topographic map of south-central Maryland and southeastern Fairfax County showing the Washington—Virginia Railway's route in Fairfax County to Mt. Vernon: 
 1929 topographic map of Washington, D.C., the city of Alexandria, Alexandria County, Falls Church and northeastern Fairfax County, showing the routes of the Arlington and Fairfax (A & F) Railway, the Mount Vernon, Alexandria and Washington (Mt V A and W) Railway and the Washington and Old Dominion Railway:

See also 
 Washington streetcars
 Washington Metro
 Urban rail transit
 Bustitution
 Trolley park

Notes

References 
 
 
 
 In Appendix K of Northern Virginia Regional Park Authority - Pre-filed Direct Testimony of Mr. Hafner, Mr. Mcray and Mr. Simmons, November 30, 2005 (Parts 4 and 5), Case No. PUE-2005-00018, Virginia State Corporation Commission. Obtained in

Further reading

External links 
 Northern Virginia Conservation Trust
 National Capital Trolley Museum
 A memorial site for DC Transit 
 Online exhibit of Washington streetcars from the National Museum of American History
 
 Before the Beltway: Streetcar Lines in Northern Virginia: Photographs from the Ames Williams Collection, an online exhibit from the Alexandria Public Library
  Brief history of Washington-Virginia Railroad with photographs of cars and route map in Arlington.

 

  Website describing the history of the Washington & Old Dominion Railroad and the Great Falls & Old Dominion Railroad, with photographs and lists of stations.
  (5:56 minutes)
 
 Rosslyn Circle History with photo from 1925

Defunct Virginia railroads
Defunct Washington, D.C., railroads
Streetcars in Virginia
Streetcars in Washington, D.C.
Transportation in Arlington County, Virginia
Transportation in Fairfax County, Virginia
Transportation in Alexandria, Virginia
Electric railways in Virginia
Electric railways in Washington, D.C.
Interurban railways in Virginia
Interurban railways in Washington, D.C.
Trolleys